Tora Vasilescu (22 March 1951) is a Romanian actress. 

She was born in Tulcea and went to local School no. 5, and then went on to High School no. 2. She showed talent for acting since she was young and later studied at the Theater Institute in Bucharest.

Vasilescu is married to Alain Vrdoljak. Previously she was married to the Romanian actor Ovidiu Moldovan and the Romanian film director Mircea Daneliuc.

In 2008 the actress whas chosen by Walt Disney Pictures to provide the Romanian voice of Merrywheater in the animated movie Sleeping Beauty. She recently appeared in the first Romanian soap opera, "Numai iubirea" ("Only Love")

Filmography 
 The Ride (1975)
 Carnival scenes (1981) 
 Glissando (1982)
 The Earth's Most Beloved Son (1993) 
 Numai iubirea (2004) 
 Ultimul stinge lumina (2004) - Melania Chircu
 Păcatele Evei (2005) 
 Meseriașii (2006) - Vera Pan
 Daria, iubirea mea (2006) 
 Războiul sexelor (2007) 
 Regina (2008) 
 State de România (2009) 
 Moștenirea (2010)
 Las Fierbinți (2013) 
 O săptămână nebună (2014) 
 Un Crăciun altfel (2014)

References

External links

1951 births
Living people
People from Tulcea
Romanian actresses
Caragiale National University of Theatre and Film alumni